is a train station in Toyokoro, Nakagawa District, Hokkaidō, Japan.

Lines
Hokkaido Railway Company
Nemuro Main Line Station K38

Adjacent stations

Railway stations in Hokkaido Prefecture
Railway stations in Japan opened in 1904